Rob Archer (born August 9, 1975) is a Canadian actor and stuntman known for his roles as Bruce in Lost Girl, Krampus in A Christmas Horror Story and Knox in Ant-Man and the Wasp.

Biography
Rob Archer grew up as an '80s kid, admiring the big-name slashers such as Jason Voorhees, Freddy Krueger and Michael Myers. However, at the age of twenty he opted to become a bodybuilder while all of his friends went off to college. His trainer's wife was a talent agent and insisted that he try out for acting. Archer recalled his first audition, "... it was a train-wreck. It was the most horrible thing I’d ever done. I remember afterwards getting into my car and I had tears streaming down my face, I was so embarrassed." After waiting a couple of months, Archer tried again and got bit parts in commercials. It was not until he got a role in Exit Wounds that he decided to take acting seriously. This was followed by years in films such as Bulletproof Monk, Red, Kick-Ass 2, RoboCop and Pixels as well as television shows such as Lost Girl, Mutant X, Alphas, XIII: The Series, Defiance, Beauty & the Beast and Warehouse 13.

Archer began gaining significant exposure for his role as the Krampus in the anthology horror film A Christmas Horror Story. He accepted the role as he felt the Krampus was an iconic creature and wanted to portray an icon on film. He described his portrayal as combining a "Marvel character with an animalistic nature". Three years later, Archer would join the cast of Ant-Man and the Wasp which is part of the Marvel Cinematic Universe.

Filmography

References

External links

Living people
1975 births
Canadian male film actors
Canadian male television actors
21st-century Canadian male actors